Arhopala vihara, the Large Spotted Oakblue, is a species of butterfly belonging to the lycaenid family described by (Cajetan Felder and Rudolf Felder in 1860. It is found in  Southeast Asia (Sumatra, Peninsular Malaya, Natuna, Borneo, Nias, Mergui, Langkawi, Pagi Island).

Subspecies
Arhopala vihara vihara (Sumatra, Peninsular Malaysia, Natuna, Borneo, possibly Nias)
Arhopala vihara hirava Corbet, 1941 (southern Burma, Mergui, Langkawi)
Arhopala vihara pagia Corbet, 1941 (northern Pagi Island)

References

External links
"Arhopala Boisduval, 1832" at Markku Savela's Lepidoptera and Some Other Life Forms

Arhopala
Butterflies described in 1860
Butterflies of Asia
Taxa named by Baron Cajetan von Felder
Taxa named by Rudolf Felder